Robert John Anderson Carnwath, Lord Carnwath of Notting Hill, CVO, PC (born 15 March 1945) is a former British Supreme Court judge.

The son of Sir Andrew Carnwath KCVO, Robert Carnwath was educated at Eton College, where he won the Newcastle Scholarship, and Trinity College, Cambridge.

Carnwath was called to the Bar at Middle Temple in 1968.  He practised in parliamentary law, planning and local government, revenue law, and administrative law.  He held the appointment of Junior Counsel to the Inland Revenue (Common Law) from 1980 to 1985, succeeded by Alan Moses, later Lord Justice Moses.  He became a Queen's Counsel in 1985, and was Attorney General to the Prince of Wales from 1988 to 1994.

He was appointed as a High Court judge on 3 October 1994, assigned to the Chancery Division, and received the customary knighthood.  He served as Chairman of the Law Commission from 1999 to July 2002.  He was promoted to the Court of Appeal on 15 January 2002 and, as is customary, became a member of the Privy Council. He was sworn in as the first Senior President of Tribunals on 12 November 2007.

On 20 December 2011, Carnwath was announced as an appointee to the Supreme Court of the United Kingdom. By Royal Warrant, all members of the Supreme Court, even if they do not hold a peerage, are entitled to the judicial courtesy title "Lord" for life. Carnwath was granted the judicial courtesy title Lord Carnwath of Notting Hill.

Carnwath is the Chairman of the Advisory Council for the Institute of Advanced Legal Studies. He plays the piano and viola, as well as singing in the Bach Choir.

Lord Carnwath is an Honorary Professor of Law at University College London, an Honorary Fellow of Trinity College, Cambridge, and a Visiting Professor in Practice at the Grantham Research Institute at the London School of Economics. Outside the law, he is a keen amateur musician. He is a former Governor of the Royal Academy of Music (Hon FRAM) and former Chairman of the Britten-Pears Foundation.

References

Bibliography
The Court of Appeal from HM Courts Service
Senior Judiciary List
Judicial Appointments from 10 Downing Street, 11 September 2001
Appointments to the Supreme Court from Supreme Court of the United Kingdom, 20 December 2011

Living people
1945 births
British people of American descent
People educated at Eton College
Alumni of Trinity College, Cambridge
Fellows of Trinity College, Cambridge
Lords Justices of Appeal
Members of the Privy Council of the United Kingdom
Chancery Division judges
Judges of the Supreme Court of the United Kingdom
Knights Bachelor
Commanders of the Royal Victorian Order
Members of the Judicial Committee of the Privy Council
Members of the Middle Temple
English King's Counsel
20th-century King's Counsel